Al-Watan Park is a 2.9 hectares municipal park that encircles the Riyadh Water Tower and is one of the eight municipal parks and gardens that constitute the King Abdulaziz Historical Centre at King Saud Road in al-Fouta neighborhood of Riyadh, Saudi Arabia. Inaugurated in December 2005 by then Riyadh governor Prince Salman ibn Abdulaziz, it is also popular for its large iconic model resembling the map of the Arabian Peninsula besides canals and waterfalls that surround the water tower.

References 

Parks in Riyadh